This is a discography documenting albums and singles released by American R&B group Blackstreet.

Albums

Studio albums

Compilation albums

Singles

As lead artist

As featured artist

Other charted songs

Soundtracks 
 CB4 
 Panther 
 Soul Food 
 Hav Plenty 
 The Rugrats Movie 
 Wild Wild West 
 The Wood

Music videos

Notes

References

Discographies of American artists
Rhythm and blues discographies